Isolation Drills is the 12th studio album by American indie rock band Guided by Voices. It was their second and final LP released under TVT Records and their second to feature a major rock producer in Rob Schnapf. The album was also their first to chart on the Billboard 200, peaking at number 168. The album notably features instrumental contributions from Elliott Smith and David Sulzer. Previous longtime band member Tobin Sprout also returned as a guest and contributed with playing piano. While Jim MacPherson plays drums on the album, his replacement Jon McCann is featured in the cover photos, as MacPherson had left the band immediately after the recording to focus on his home life.

Reception 
Isolation Drills is currently the highest rating album on the aggregate review website Metacritic of their submitted studio albums.

Accolades 
"Glad Girls" was nominated for the High Times "Pot Song of the Year" award. "Chasing Heather Crazy" was named the 319th best song of the decade by Pitchfork. In 2014, the album was ranked number 92 on PopMatters list of the Best Albums of the '00s.

Appearance in popular culture 

 "Skills Like This" was featured on the ESPN Ultimate X Soundtrack compilation album.

Track listing
All songs written by Robert Pollard.
"Fair Touching" – 3:07
"Skills Like This" – 2:47
"Chasing Heather Crazy" – 2:53
"Frostman" – 0:55
"Twilight Campfighter" – 3:07
"Sister I Need Wine" – 1:40
"Want One?" – 1:48
"The Enemy" – 4:53
"Unspirited" – 2:25
"Glad Girls" – 3:49
"Run Wild" – 3:48
"Pivotal Film" – 3:10
"How's My Drinking?" – 2:38
"The Brides Have Hit Glass" – 2:51
"Fine to See You" – 3:16
"Privately" – 4:05

Title 
The opening of "The Enemy" is an excerpt of "Broadcastor House," a track from the 1994 Clown Prince of the Menthol Trailer EP, which may come from the fact that "Broadcastor House" was the initial working title of the album.

Personnel

Guided by Voices 

 Robert Pollard – lead vocals, guitar
 Doug Gillard – lead guitar
 Nate Farley – rhythm guitar
 Tim Tobias – bass
 Jim Macpherson – drums

Additional musicians 

 David Soldier – string arrangements, violin
 Tobin Sprout – piano
 Elliott Smith – piano
 Marlene Rice – violin

Technical 

 Rob Schnapf – mixing, producer
Doug Boehm – engineer, mixing
 Julian Joyce – mixing
 John Shough – engineer
 Greg Di Gesu – assistant engineer
 Don Tyler – mastering

References

Guided by Voices albums
2001 albums
Albums produced by Rob Schnapf